This was the first edition of the tournament.

Filip Krajinović won the title, defeating Norbert Gombos in the final, 6–4, 6–4.

Seeds

Draw

Finals

Top half

Bottom half

References

External Links
 Main Draw
 Qualifying Draw

Internazionali di Tennis Citta di Vicenzaa - Singles
2014 Singles
AON